Jennifer Paweensuda Saetan-Drouin (born 12 October 1993), also known by her Thai nickname Fahsai, is a Thai-Canadian model, television host, DJ, and beauty pageant titleholder who was crowned Miss Universe Thailand 2019. She represented Thailand in the Miss Universe 2019 competition, ultimately placing in the top five.

Born and raised in Canada, Paweensuda moved to Thailand to work as a model and DJ. After placing as the first runner-up in Miss Thailand 2013 and second runner-up in Miss Universe Thailand 2017, Paweensuda was appointed Miss Earth Thailand 2017 and went on to place in the Top 8 at Miss Earth 2017.

Early life
Paweensuda was born as Jennifer Paweensuda Saetan-Drouin on 12 October 1993. She was born in Montreal, Quebec, Canada. She is often affectionately referred to by her Thai nickname Fahsai. Her mother is Thai Chinese, while her father is Canadian, of Cuban-French descent. After finishing high school, Paweensuda enrolled in the University of Calgary. In 2017, she graduated with a degree in kinesiology. Paweensuda moved from Canada to Bangkok as an adult, in order to work as a DJ.

Pageantry
Paweensuda Drouin began her pageantry career in Thailand in 2013, entering the Miss Thailand Chinese Cosmos 2013 competition; she ultimately finished as the second runner-up. Afterwards, she was selected to represent Thailand in the Miss Chinese Cosmos Southeast Asia 2013 competition in Malaysia, where she placed within the top eight. After this experience, Drouin began taking part in more major Thai pageants. In December 2013, she competed in Miss Thailand 2013 and finished as the first runner-up; although the winner of Miss Thailand is not sent to any international competitions, it is the oldest and most traditional pageant in Thailand, and Drouin stated that she competed to honor her mother's wishes.

After Miss Thailand, Paweensuda Drouin began to focus on her education and retreated from pageantry. She returned in 2017, competing in Miss Universe Thailand 2017. She went on to place as the second runner up to Maria Poonlertlarp and also won the special award Miss Smile. Following her performance in Miss Universe Thailand 2017, Drouin was appointed to represent Thailand at Miss Earth 2017, where she placed in the Top 8. Two years later, Paweensuda Drouin returned to Miss Universe Thailand and competed in Miss Universe Thailand 2019. Being a major frontrunner for the crown, Drouin went on to win the competition, being crowned by outgoing titleholder Sophida Kanchanarin and Catriona Gray of the Philippines, who had been crowned Miss Universe 2018. In the competition, she won the Best Swimsuit, Perfect Poses, Miss Popular Vote awards, and was one of ten contestants awarded the Golden Tiara. Drouin represented Thailand at Miss Universe 2019. and placed as a Top 5 finalist together with Gabriela Tafur of Colombia.

Filmography

Television Dramas

Television show

Music video

Awards and nominations

Notes

References

1993 births
Living people
21st-century Canadian women
Paweensuda Drouin
Canadian beauty pageant winners
Canadian DJs
Canadian people of Chinese descent
Canadian people of French descent
Canadian people of Thai descent
Female models from Quebec
Miss Earth 2017 contestants
Miss Earth Thailand
Miss Universe 2019 contestants
Paweensuda Drouin
Models from Montreal
Paweensuda Drouin
Paweensuda Drouin
Paweensuda Drouin
Paweensuda Drouin
Paweensuda Drouin
Paweensuda Drouin
University of Calgary alumni
Paweensuda Drouin
Paweensuda Drouin
Paweensuda Drouin
Paweensuda Drouin
Paweensuda Drouin